Peter M. Brockman is an American politician who served as a Republican member of the Oregon State Senate, representing the 27th district from 1985 until 1993.

References

Year of birth missing (living people)
Republican Party Oregon state senators
Living people
Santa Clara University alumni